Water (Hindi: जल) is a 2005 drama film written and directed by Deepa Mehta, with screenplay by Anurag Kashyap. It is set in 1938 and explores the lives of widows at an ashram in Varanasi, India. The film is also the third and final installment of Mehta's Elements trilogy. It was preceded by Fire (1996) and Earth (1998). Author Bapsi Sidhwa wrote the 2006 novel based upon the film, Water: A Novel, published by Milkweed Press. Sidhwa's earlier novel, Cracking India was the basis for Earth, the second film in the trilogy.

Water is a dark introspect into the tales of rural Indian widows in the 1940s and covers controversial and subjects such as child marriage, misogyny and ostracism. The film premiered at the 2005 Toronto International Film Festival, where it was honoured with the Opening Night Gala, and was released across Canada in November of that year. It was first released in India on 9 March 2007.

The film stars Seema Biswas, Lisa Ray, John Abraham and Sarala Kariyawasam in pivotal roles and Manorama, Kulbhushan Kharbanda, Waheeda Rehman, Raghuvir Yadav and Vinay Pathak in supporting roles. Featured songs for the film were composed by A. R. Rahman, with lyrics by Sukhwinder Singh and Raqeeb Alam. After Rahman quit the film following nationwide controversy, the background score was composed by Mychael Danna, although the songs which Rahman had composed before opting out were retained.

In 2008, inspired by the film, Dilip Mehta directed a documentary, The Forgotten Woman about widows in India. The film was also written by Deepa Mehta.

Plot 
In 1938 India, Chuyia (Sarala Kariyawasam) is an eight-year-old girl, whose husband suddenly dies. In keeping with traditions of widowhood, she is dressed in a white sari, her head is shaven and she is left in an ashram, to spend the rest of her life in renunciation. There are fourteen women who live in the dilapidated house, sent there to expiate bad karma, as well as to relieve their families of the financial and emotional burdens of caring for widows. The ashram is ruled by Madhumati (Manorama), a pompous lady in her 70s. Her only friend is the pimp, Gulabi (Raghuvir Yadav), a hijra who keeps Madhumati supplied with cannabis. The two also have a side business: Gulabi helps Madhumati prostitute Kalyani (Lisa Ray), a beautiful young widow, by ferrying her across the Ganges to customers. Kalyani was forced into prostitution as a teenager to support the ashram.

Shakuntala (Seema Biswas) is perhaps the most enigmatic of the women. Attractive, witty and sharp, she is also one of the few widows who can read. She exudes enough anger that even Madhumati leaves her alone. Shakuntala is caught between being a God-fearing, devout Hindu, and her hatred of being a widow. She seeks the counsel of Sadananda (Kulbhushan Kharbanda), a priest, who makes her aware of her unjust and unholy situation. She becomes attached to Chuyia upon her arrival at the ashram.

Chuyia is convinced that her stay is a temporary one and that her mother will come to take her away but quickly adapts to her new life. She befriends Kalyani, and witnesses Kalyani's budding romance with Narayan (John Abraham), a charming upper-class follower of Mahatma Gandhi. Despite her initial reluctance, Kalyani eventually buys into his dream of marriage and a new life in Calcutta. She agrees to go away with him.

Her plan is disrupted when Chuyia accidentally reveals their affair to Madhumati. Enraged at losing a source of income and afraid of the social disgrace, Madhumati locks Kalyani up. Much to everyone's surprise, the God-fearing Shakuntala lets Kalyani out to go meet Narayan, who ferries her across the river to take her to his home. However, when Kalyani recognizes Narayan's bungalow, she realizes that Narayan is the son of one of the men whom she has been pimped out to. In shock, she demands that he take her back. Narayan confronts his father, learning the reason for Kalyani's actions. Disgusted, he decides to walk out on his father and join Mahatma Gandhi (Mohan Jhangiani). He arrives at the ashram to take Kalyani with him, only to find that Kalyani has drowned herself.

Madhumati sends Chuyia away to be prostituted as a replacement for Kalyani. Shakuntala finds out and tries to prevent the worst, but she is too late. When Shakuntala finds Chuyia, Chuyia is deeply traumatized and catatonic. Cradling Chuyia, Shakuntala spends the night on the shores of the river. Walking through town with Chuyia in her arms, she hears talk of Gandhi speaking at the train station, ready to leave town. She follows the crowd to receive his blessing. As the train departs, in an act of desperation Shakuntala runs alongside the train, asking people to take Chuyia with them. She spots Narayan on the train and hands Chuyia over to him. The train departs, carrying Chuyia away while leaving the teary-eyed Shakuntala behind.

Cast 
 Seema Biswas as Shakuntala/Gyanvati Twins double role
 Lisa Ray as Kalyani
 John Abraham as Narayan
 Waheeda Rehman as Bhagavati, Narayan's Mother
 Sarala Kariyawasam as Chuyia
 Buddhi Wickrama as Baba
 Ronica Sajnani as Kunti
 Manorama as Madhumati
 Rishma Malik as Snehalata
 Vidula Javalgekar as Patiraji (auntie)
 Daya Alwis as Saduram
 Raghuvir Yadav as Gulabi
 Vinay Pathak as Rabindra
 Kulbhushan Kharbanda as Sadananda
 Gerson Da Cunha as Seth Dwarkanath
 Iranganie Serasinghe as Mother-in-Law
 Mohan Jhangiani as Mahatma Gandhi
 Sanoja Bibile as Woman Bather

Production 
Water is a co-production between Canada, India and the United States. The film was shot twice with the same (bilingual) actors, once in Hindi, once in English.

Release 
The film debuted on 8 September 2005 at the Toronto International Film Festival and opened in other theatres at the dates given below. After several controversies surrounding the film in India, the Indian censor boards cleared the film with a "U" certificate. It was released in India on 9 March 2007.

During Sri Lanka screening, the film collected Rs. 42 million for its 38 days screening.

Reception

Accolades

Critical response 
The film received high praise from Kevin Thomas, writing in the Los Angeles Times:
For all her impassioned commitment as a filmmaker, Mehta never preaches but instead tells a story of intertwining strands in a wholly compelling manner. Water, set in the British colonial India of 1938, is as beautiful as it is harrowing, its idyllic setting beside the sacred Ganges River contrasting with the widows' oppressive existence as outcasts. The film seethes with anger over their plight yet never judges, and possesses a lyrical, poetical quality. Just like the Ganges, life goes on flowing, no matter what. Mehta sees her people in the round, entrapped and blinded by a cruel and outmoded custom dictated by ancient religious texts but sustained more often by a family's desire to relieve itself of the economic burden of supporting widows. As a result, she is able to inject considerable humor in her stunningly perceptive and beautifully structured narrative. Water emerges as a film of extraordinary richness and complexity.

Jeannette Catsoulis of The New York Times selected Water as NYT Critics' Pick, calling it "exquisite": "Serene on the surface yet roiling underneath, the film neatly parallels the plight of widows under Hindu fundamentalism to that of India under British colonialism".

Water received mostly positive reviews. On Rotten Tomatoes the film has an approval rating of 90% based on reviews from 94 critics, with an average rating of 7.6 out of 10. The site's consensus is that "this compassionate work of social criticism is also luminous, due to both its lyrical imagery and cast". On Metacritic the film has a weighted average score of 77 out of 100, based on 25 critics reviews, indicating "generally favorable reviews".

Roger Ebert of Chicago Sun-Times said: "The film is lovely in the way Satyajit Ray's films are lovely and the best elements of Water involve the young girl and the experiences seen through her eyes. I would have been content if the entire film had been her story" and gave it three stars out of four. Carrie Rickey of The Philadelphia Inquirer also praises Mehta's work on the trilogy saying that "profound, passionate and overflowing with incomparable beauty, Water, like the prior two films in director Deepa Mehta's "Elements" trilogy, celebrates the lives of women who resist marginalisation by Indian society".

In December 2005, it was named to the Toronto International Film Festival's annual Canada's Top Ten list of the year's best Canadian films.

Soundtrack

Controversies 
Mehta had originally intended to direct Water in February 2000, with the actors Shabana Azmi, Nandita Das and Akshay Kumar. Her earlier film, Fire, however, had previously attracted hostility from conservative right-wing organizations, which objected to her subject matter and portrayal of conservative households in a negative light. Protestors organised protests and attacks on cinemas that screened that film. The day before filming of Water was due to begin, the crew was informed that there were complications with their location permits for filming. The following day, they learned that 2,000 protesters had stormed the ghats, destroying and burning the main film set and throwing the remnants into the Ganges in protest of what ultimately were revealed to be false accusations regarding the subject matter of the film. A right-wing politician Arun Pathak also organised a suicide protest to stop the film production.

The resulting tensions and economic setbacks led to several years of struggle as Mehta was eventually forced to film Water in Sri Lanka, rather than in India. Finally Mehta was able to make the film, but with a new cast and under a false title (River Moon) in 2003. The struggle to make the film was detailed by Mehta's daughter, Devyani Saltzman, in a non-fiction book, Shooting Water: A Mother-Daughter Journey and the Making of the Film.

See also 
 List of Canadian submissions for the Academy Award for Best Foreign Language Film
 List of artistic depictions of Mahatma Gandhi

References

Bibliography 
 
 Displacing Androcracy: Cosmopolitan Partnerships in Bapsi Sidhwa's Water

External links 
 
 
 
 

2005 films
2005 drama films
Canadian drama films
English-language Canadian films
2000s Hindi-language films
English-language Indian films
Film controversies
Film controversies in Canada
Film controversies in India
Cultural depictions of Mahatma Gandhi
Films about women in India
Films about widowhood in India
Films shot in Sri Lanka
Films set in 1938
Films set in India
Films set in the British Raj
Films directed by Deepa Mehta
Films scored by Mychael Danna
Films scored by A. R. Rahman
Films with screenplays by Anurag Kashyap
2000s Canadian films